Kyle Amor (born 26 May 1987) is an Ireland international rugby league footballer who plays as a  for the Widnes Vikings in the Betfred Championship.

He played for Whitehaven in the  Championship winning the competition Young Player of the Year award. Amor played for the Leeds Rhinos in the Super League, and on loan from Leeds at Whitehaven in the Championship and the Wakefield Trinity Wildcats in the Super League. He later joined Wakefield on a permanent deal, before joining Saints.

At St Helens he has won the Super League Grand Final three times; in 2014, 2019 & 2020 as well as the Super League League Leaders Shield in 2014, 2018 & 2019. Amor also featured off the bench in the 2019 Challenge Cup Final loss at Wembley Stadium to the Warrington Wolves. Amor came off the bench and scored the final try of the game in the 2021 Challenge Cup 26-12 victory over the Castleford Tigers

Background
Amor was born in Whitehaven, Cumbria, England.

Early career
He started his career playing amateur Rugby league for Hensingham ARLFC. Impressing throughout the amateur circles as a youngster representing BARLA U’21s in 2007 and Open Age level in 2008. He later signed form Hensingham ARLFC to Whitehaven R.L.F.C. in 2009 at the age of 21 years old.

Playing career

Club career

Whitehaven
Amor began his career at home town club Whitehaven R.L.F.C.

Leeds Rhinos
He signed a full time contract with Leeds.

Wakefield Trinity
After failing to cement a first team spot at Leeds Rhinos he spent three seasons with Wakefield Trinity.

St Helens

He was announced as a St Helens player on 10 September 2013 for a fee of £50,000 and signing a four-year contract. St. Helens reached the 2014 Super League Grand Final, and Amor was selected to play as a starting prop forward in their 14-6 victory ove Wigan at Old Trafford.

In 2016, Amor won the Player of the Year for St Helens at the club's end of season awards and signed a new 3-year contract to keep him at the club until the end of 2020 season.

Amor played in the 2019 Challenge Cup Final defeat by the Warrington Wolves at Wembley Stadium. He played in the 2019 Super League Grand Final victory over the Salford Red Devils at Old Trafford.

In 2020, Amor signed a new one year deal with St Helens for the 2021 season. Amor played in St Helens 8-4 2020 Super League Grand Final victory over Wigan at the Kingston Communications Stadium in Hull.

On 17 July 2021, Amor played in the 26-12 2021 Challenge Cup Final victory at Wembley Stadium over the Castleford Tigers scoring the final try of the game to end St Helens 13 year Challenge Cup drought. In round 17 of the 2021 Super League season, Amor played his 200th game for St Helens and scored a try during the club's 42-10 victory over Hull F.C.

On 9 October 2021, Amor was named on the interchange bench for St. Helens in their 2021 Super League Grand Final against Catalans Dragons but spent the entire match on the sideline having played no minutes.  St. Helens would win the match 12-10 and claim their third straight premiership.

Warrington (loan)
On 24 May 2022, Amor signed a loan deal to join Warrington for the remainder of the 2022 Super League season.

Widnes Vikings
On 10 July 2022, it was reported he had signed a part-time deal to join Widnes Vikings for the 2023 season.

Internataional career

Ireland
In 2011, he made his International début for Ireland against Scotland in the Autumn International Series.

In 2017, he represented Ireland in the Rugby League World Cup playing in Australia & Papua New Guinea. Amor scored a try in Ireland's winning opening match against Italy.

Cumbria
On 5 Oct 2022, he captained Cumbria in a World Cup warm-up game against .

References

External links
Statistics at rugbyleagueproject.org
St Helens profile
SL profile
2017 RLWC profile
Saints Heritage Society profile

1987 births
Living people
Cumbria rugby league team captains
Cumbria rugby league team players
English rugby league players
English people of Irish descent
English television presenters
Ireland national rugby league team players
Leeds Rhinos players
English rugby league commentators
Rugby league props
Rugby league players from Whitehaven
St Helens R.F.C. players
Wakefield Trinity players
Warrington Wolves players
Widnes Vikings players
Whitehaven R.L.F.C. players